Pseudoschoenus is a monotypic genus of flowering plants belonging to the family Cyperaceae. The only species is Pseudoschoenus inanis.

Its native range is South Africa.

References

Cyperaceae
Cyperaceae genera
Monotypic Poales genera